The 2017 Omaha Beef season was the team's eighteenth and third as a member of Champions Indoor Football (CIF). One of 14 teams in the CIF for the 2017 season, they played in the 7-team North Conference.

The Beef played their home games at the Ralston Arena in Ralston, Nebraska, under the direction of head coach Cory Ross.

Schedule
Key:

Regular season

Standings

Postseason

Roster

References

External links
 Omaha Beef official site

2017 in sports in Nebraska
Omaha Beef
Omaha Beef seasons